Nicolas Reidtler (born 5 December 1947) is a Venezuelan former cyclist. He competed in the individual road race event at the 1976 Summer Olympics. He is a two-time winner of the Vuelta a Venezuela race.

References

External links
 

1947 births
Living people
Venezuelan male cyclists
Olympic cyclists of Venezuela
Cyclists at the 1976 Summer Olympics
Place of birth missing (living people)
20th-century Venezuelan people